Telo i duša (trans. Body and Soul) is an album by the Serbian gothic rock band Trivalia. It was released in 1990.

Track listing

Side A

Side B

External links 
 Telo i duša at Discogs

1990 albums